Never Is Forever is the second full-length album by the Norwegian rock band Turbonegro, released in 1994 via Dog Job Records. It was a limited and CD-only release to only 1,000 copies (some accounts suggest 1,200). Bitzcore Records re-released the album remastered and with a new "Derrick-style" cover artwork in 1999. 

The album—a tribute to Blue Öyster Cult, as claimed by the band themselves—is an attempt to dissociate from the lo-fi aestethics of the garage scene: "When the rest of the punk oriented world tried hard to be lo-fi and 'real', Turbonegro as usual went the opposite way, creating a miniature suburban deathpunk opera. Seldom have pop culture, darkness and desperation blended so well."

The track "Hush, Earthling" features dialogue sampled from the 1980 film Flash Gordon.

Four songs from the (He's a) Grunge Whore EP are also included here.

The CD version includes three hidden tracks at the end of the final track: Bengt "Bingo" Calmeyer singing "Staten och kapitalet", a 1970s radical left-wing progressive rock tune by Blå Tåget made into a national hit song in Sweden in 1980 by punk rock band Ebba Grön; Evel Knievel performing a poem named "Why?"; and John Culliton Mahoney performing his song "The Ballad of Evel Knievel".

Track listing 
 Letter from Your Momma – 2:16
 Suburban Prince's Death Song – 3:36
 Übermensch – 3:37
 I Will Never Die – 3:54
 No Beast So Fierce – 3:54
 Destination: Hell – 3:23
 Timebomb – 3:18
 Pain in der Arsch Pocket Full of Cash – 1:31
 Hush, Earthling – 3:14
 Nihil Sleighride – 2:59
 (He's a) Grunge Whore – 4:37
 Black Chrome – 2:26
 Oslo Bloodbath Pt. II: I Don't Care – 2:44
 Oslo Bloodbath Pt. III: The Ballad of Gerda and Tore – 24:26
00:00-06:04 – "Oslo Bloodbath Pt. III: The Ballad of Gerda and Tore"
06:04-12:04 – six minutes of silence
12:04-16:58 – "Staten och Kapitalet"
16:58-19:58 – "Why?"
19:58-24:26 – "The Ballad of Evel Knievel"

Personnel

Band members 
 Hans Erik – vocals
 Rune – guitar
 Pål – guitar/vocals
 Bengt – bass/vocals
 Thomas – drums

Additional musicians 
 Åsgeir Knudsen – additional instruments on "Letter from Your Momma"

Production 
 Morten Anderson – photography
 Ando – photography
 Christian A. Calmeyer – engineer
 Dimitri – artwork
 Craig Morris – editing, mastering

References 

1994 albums
Turbonegro albums